Euroleague 2007–08 quarterfinals are the four quarterfinals of Euroleague 2007-08, and its main leading to Final Four. There are only eight teams, who will play two or three games series. Third games will be played, if necessary.

Bracket

* if necessary

Results

Quarterfinal 1

Quarterfinal 2

Quarterfinal 3

Quarterfinal 4

External links
Format
Euroleague.net

quarterfinals
2007–08 in Spanish basketball
2007–08 in Italian basketball
2007–08 in Turkish basketball
2007–08 in Greek basketball
2007–08 in Serbian basketball
2007–08 in Israeli basketball
2007–08 in Russian basketball